Bomma Venkateshwar was an Indian advocate and politician belonging to Indian National Congress. He was elected as a member of Andhra Pradesh Legislative Assembly from Indurthi in 1999. He died of cardiac arrest on 18 March 2019 at the age of 78.

References

1940s births
2019 deaths
Indian National Congress politicians
Members of the Andhra Pradesh Legislative Assembly
Indian lawyers